Guarding of Machinery Convention, 1963 is  an International Labour Organization Convention.

It was established in 1963, with the preamble stating:
Having decided upon the adoption of certain proposals with regard to the prohibition of the sale, hire and use of inadequately guarded machinery,...

Ratifications
As of 2013, the convention has been ratified by 52 states.

External links 
Text.
Ratifications.

International Labour Organization conventions
Treaties concluded in 1963
Treaties entered into force in 1965
Occupational safety and health treaties
Machinery
Treaties of Algeria
Treaties of Azerbaijan
Treaties of the Byelorussian Soviet Socialist Republic
Treaties of Bosnia and Herzegovina
Treaties of Brazil
Treaties of the Central African Republic
Treaties of the Republic of the Congo
Treaties of Croatia
Treaties of Cyprus
Treaties of the Democratic Republic of the Congo (1964–1971)
Treaties of Denmark
Treaties of the Dominican Republic
Treaties of Ecuador
Treaties of Finland
Treaties of Ghana
Treaties of Guatemala
Treaties of Guinea
Treaties of Ba'athist Iraq
Treaties of Italy
Treaties of Japan
Treaties of Jordan
Treaties of Kuwait
Treaties of Kyrgyzstan
Treaties of Latvia
Treaties of Luxembourg
Treaties of Madagascar
Treaties of Malaysia
Treaties of Malta
Treaties of Moldova
Treaties of Montenegro
Treaties of Morocco
Treaties of Nicaragua
Treaties of Niger
Treaties of Norway
Treaties of Panama
Treaties of Paraguay
Treaties of the Polish People's Republic
Treaties of the Soviet Union
Treaties of San Marino
Treaties of Serbia and Montenegro
Treaties of Yugoslavia
Treaties of Sierra Leone
Treaties of Slovenia
Treaties of Francoist Spain
Treaties of Switzerland
Treaties of Sweden
Treaties of Syria
Treaties of Tajikistan
Treaties of North Macedonia
Treaties of Tunisia
Treaties of Turkey
Treaties of the Ukrainian Soviet Socialist Republic
Treaties of the United Kingdom
1963 in labor relations